The Hirsel is a Category A Listed stately home near Coldstream, Berwickshire in the Scottish Borders council area. It has been a seat of the Earls of Home since 1611, and the principal seat following the destruction of Hume Castle during the mid-17th century. It was the home of the former British prime minister, Sir Alec Douglas-Home, the 14th Earl of Home.

Architecture
A large mellow Georgian house of grey stone, most of which dates from the early 18th century, with an earlier portion dating from the early 17th century. Victorian alterations and additions were carried out by William Burn in 1851. David Bryce, George Henderson, and James Campbell Walker are also known to have worked here. Most of the Victorian additions were demolished during the mid 20th century. The interior contains a fine stone staircase in the centre portion.

Garden and park
The house is set within an outstanding designated English garden style late 18th to 19th century designed landscape which spans the valley of Leet Water. The landscape comprises informal parkland, woodland, and a large artificial lake (Hirsel Lake), and a late 19th century rhododendron and azalea woodland garden, Dundock Wood. The walled garden dates from the mid 18th century. In addition to forming an attractive setting for the category-A listed house, the grounds contain nationally important archaeological remains, a designated Site of Special Scientific Interest (SSSI) and two notable heritage trees.

Visitor access
The Homestead Craft Centre and Museum of Country Life, the Tea Room and Craft Workshops are all located within the grounds. The 'Homestead Walk' and the 'Hirsel Walk' are open to the public 365 days of the year.

References

External links
Douglas & Angus Estates website

Hirsel
Hirsel
Hirsel
Hirsel
Hirsel
Hirsel
Alec Douglas-Home